is a Japanese manga series written and illustrated by You Higuri. It is licensed in North America by Digital Manga Publishing, which released the first volume of the manga on 10 June 2009, and the second on 23 September 2009. It has been licensed in France and Germany by Panini Comics. It fictionalises the story of Ludwig II of Bavaria.

Release

Reception
Holly Ellingwood, writing for Active Anime, enjoyed how You Higuri brought historical facts into her story.  Casey Brienza, writing for Graphic Novel Reporter, described Ludwig II as being "an updated Rose of Versailles", due to its "bold lines, asymmetrical layouts" and European setting, describing it as being less about the history than about the personalities in that time. Katherine Dacey enjoyed Higuri's "sensual artwork — her languid character designs, sumptuous interiors, and Wagnerian imagery", but disliked the sexual torture of the king's lover, Richard Hornig. Leroy Douresseaux, writing for Comic Book Bin, felt "You Higuri's use of romantic entanglements, sex, and political machinations makes for an excellent, engaging read." and also enjoyed the artwork, noting Higuri's use of toning and sparkling techniques around Ludwig to symbolise the "enchanted fantasy world he wants to inhabit". Melinda Beasi, writing for PopCultureShock, felt that the plot could have been closer to real life, but noted that the "palpable loneliness" of the real Ludwig II does not fit well into the boys love genre.

References

Further reading

External links

1996 manga
Digital Manga Publishing titles
Historical anime and manga
Kadokawa Shoten manga
Yaoi anime and manga
You Higuri
Comics set in the 19th century
Comics set in Germany
Comics based on real people
Cultural depictions of Ludwig II of Bavaria